Diogo Bento Freire (born 30 March 1990) is a Portuguese footballer who played as goalkeeper.

Football career
On 1 December 2013, Freire made his professional debut with Trofense in a 2013–14 Segunda Liga match against Feirense.

References

External links

Stats and profile at LPFP 

1990 births
Living people
Portuguese footballers
Association football goalkeepers
Liga Portugal 2 players
União Montemor players
C.D. Trofense players
C.D. Aves players
Académico de Viseu F.C. players
Eléctrico F.C. players
Sportspeople from Évora District